Vie et Passion du Christ (English: Life and Passion of the Christ) is a 44-minute French silent film that was produced and released in 1903. As such, it is one of the earliest feature-length narrative films.

The film, with sequences made in the stencil color process Pathéchrome, takes a straightforward approach to its subject matter. All scenes are introduced by an inter-title giving the traditional name of the event (the Annunciation, the Nativity, etc.) followed by the actors playing out the familiar stories from the Gospels. Other than the scene titles, there are no other inter-titles. Many of the scenes attempt to recreate the illustrations of the life of Christ by Gustave Doré in detail.

In 1932, the film was re-issued in the U.S., distributed on a states-rights basis. Instead of the stencil coloring effect, however, the film was printed on red-tinted stock, with a musical score by James C. Bradford.

Its original French title was La Vie et la passion de Jésus Christ (The Life and the Passion of Jesus Christ).

See also
List of films based on the Bible
List of early color feature films

References

External links

1903 films
1900s color films
Films about Jesus
Films directed by Ferdinand Zecca
French black-and-white films
French silent feature films
Silent films in color
Religious epic films
Portrayals of the Virgin Mary in film
Portrayals of Saint Joseph in film
Early color films
1900s French films